John Brinckman, originally  Johann Friedrich Brinckmann  (3 July 1814, Rostock - 20 September 1870, Güstrow) was a German author of humorous works in Plattdeutsch.

Biography 

He was the second of nine children born to Caspar Christoph Michael Brinckmann (1786-1824), a sea captain, and his wife, Anna née Ruth (1794-1870), daughter of the Port Commander in Göteborg. His father drowned in a shipwreck off Jutland when he was only ten. His education began in a private "", where one of his aunts was his teacher.

Beginning in 1834, he was a student at the University of Rostock. In 1838, he served three months in prison for attempting to create an Anti-monarchist organization.. He requested and received a pardon from Grand Duke Paul Friedrich, but was unable to complete his studies and decided to go to the United States. He settled in New York City; remaining there until 1841. After surviving a case of yellow fever, he returned to Germany.

On the advice of his doctor, he went to live with his college friend, a pastor in Lohmen. While staying in the rectory, Gustav and his brother, Ludwig, who was a clerk at Dobbertin Abbey, helped him seek employment. During his search, he met Elise Burmeister, the daughter of a doctor in Goldberg, who worked as a teacher there and would later become his wife.

From 1842 to 1844, he worked as a tutor for a noble family near Neukalen, but was displeased with the way he was treated; especially by the wife of the Chamberlain, who was apparently domineering and arrogant. After consulting with the manager of the Abbey, he was able to procure a position as a tutor for Le Fort's children. His situation there was satisfactory, and he was closer to Elise than before. They were married in 1846.

He and his fellow writer, Fritz Reuter, took part in the first demonstration in Güstrow. Shortly after, he applied for a vacancy at the Realschule there. After teaching a trial lesson, he was hired and moved his family to a modest apartment nearby. He and Elise eventually had ten children, forcing him to ask for advances to his salary, and take out loans. He also gave private lessons in his spare time. From 1856 to 1862, he was a member of a citizen's committee campaigning for better schools.

After 1854, he composed numerous poems, short stories, and assorted non-fiction works in Plattdeutsch. His writings were largely overshadowed by Reuter's, who also wrote in Plattdeutsch, and many of them did not become popular until after his death, which occurred in 1870, when he suffered a fatal stroke at the age of fifty-six. Several schools in Mecklenburg and a cargo ship (sank in 1926) were later named after him.

Selected works 
 Kasper Ohm un ick. (Memories of his childhood, 1855–1868) (Online) Reissued in 1993 by Hinstorff 
 Vagel Grip. (Poetry, 1859) (Online) Reissued in 2008 by DirectMedia

References

Further reading
 
 
 Wolfgang Siegmund: John Brinckman – 1814 bis 1870. Ein Lebensbild. Altstadt-Verlag, Rostock 2000, 
 Willi Passig: John Brinckman. Ein biographisches Kaleidoskop, Edition Pommern, Elmenhorst/Vorpommern 2014,

External links 

 
 
 
 Six works by Brinckman @ Project Gutenberg
 Entry for Brinckman @ Die Niederdeutsche Literatur

1814 births
1870 deaths
German writers
Humorous poets
Low German literature
University of Rostock alumni
People from Rostock